Cheshunt is a National Rail and London Overground station in Cheshunt, Hertfordshire, England. On the London Overground network it is one of three northern termini of the Lea Valley lines.

History

Cheshunt's first railway
A railway existed in Cheshunt before the station and the main line from London were originally opened in the 1840s. The horse-drawn Cheshunt Railway was opened on 26 June 1825. This long-defunct railway is of interest as it was the world's first passenger-carrying monorail and the first railway line to open in Hertfordshire.

Early years (1840-1862)
Initially a temporary station was opened on Cadmore Lane to the north of the current station but that only lasted for a couple of months between April and 1 June 1842. The existing station was opened by the Eastern Counties Railway who had leased the N&ER from 1 January 1844,on 31 May 1846 and was located near the level crossing on Windmill Lane. The two platformed station was of timber construction with a two-storey station building and platforms either side of the level crossing. In November 1861 gas lighting was provided.

By the 1860s the railways in East Anglia were in financial trouble, and most were leased to the ECR; they wished to amalgamate formally, but could not obtain government agreement for this until 1862, when the Great Eastern Railway was formed by amalgamation. Thus Cheshunt became a GER station in 1862.

Great Eastern Railway (1862-1922)
In 1881 a footbridge was provided. With the development of horticulture in the Lea Valley during the early 1880s a small goods yard was provided. 

A new line from Bury Street Junction, north of Lower Edmonton High Level railway station, to Cheshunt was opened by the Great Eastern Railway on 1 October 1891 and known as the Churchbury Loop. Around this time the station was rebuilt with both platforms located south of the level crossing and additional bay platforms being provided on the up and down side of the station. brick and tile station buildings were provided and a new signal box was provided.

In 1905 the platforms were extended and the station was repainted the following year.

In 1907 a short siding on the up side south of the station to a ballast pit operated by Boyer & Son was opened. Expansion of the horticultural industry saw the goods yard extended in 1909. Inwards traffic was manure and coal for the horticultural industry.

Falling passenger numbers saw the Churchbury Loop passenger services  withdrawn on 1 October 1909 and the then President of the Board of Trade, Winston Churchill, had to answer a question on the subject in the House of Commons as a railway closure was, at that point, a rare occurrence.

During World War I the Lea Valley was a centre of the munitions industry and the government called on the GER to restore passenger services which served the original stations. but once the war finished demand again fell off and services were withdrawn on 1 July 1919.

London & North Eastern Railway (1923-1947)
On 1 January 1923 the GER became part of the London & North Eastern Railway.

In 1932 a new down loop was added south of  the junction for the Churchbury Loop line. At this stage the signal box which was located south of the station on the up side had 63 levers for the operation of points and signals.

British Railways (1948-1996)
The nationalisation of Britain's railways saw the operation of Cheshunt station pass to British Railways Eastern Region.
from 1958 local passenger services between Cheshunt and London via Tottenham Hale were normally operated by Class 125 diesel multiple units.
This saw the restoration of passenger services to the former Churchbury Loop line which was renamed the Southbury Loop. Because the Lea Valley local services were diesel operated the down side bay where these normally terminated was not electrified.

The goods yard was closed on 1 June 1966.

In preparation for the new Lea Valley electric services the area was re-signalled on 11/12 January 1969 although Cheshunt signal box was retained.

The lines south via  were not electrified until 10 March the same year with electric passenger services starting on 5 May 1969.

When sectorisation was introduced in the 1980s, the station was served by Network SouthEast until the privatisation of British Railways.

The Privatisation Era (1996-present)
With the privatisation of the UK's railways in 1994 operation of the station was initially allocated to a business unit which succeeded the old British Railways structure before being taken over by West Anglia Great Northern (WAGN) in January 1997.

In August 2002 signalling control was transferred to the Liverpool Street Integrated Electronic Control Centre (IECC), although the signal box officially closed on 24 May 2003.

WAGN operated the station from January 1997 until 2004 when the UK Strategic Rail Authority made changes to the franchise arrangements and the line became part of the Greater Anglia franchise which covered the whole of East Anglia.

National Express East Anglia fulfilled a commitment to extend the bay platform at Cheshunt to accommodate eight-coach trains (previously it could only accommodate six coaches). The works also involved replacing all existing station buildings, and replacing the station footbridge. Construction commenced in December 2005 and was largely complete by August 2006.

Abellio began operating the franchise, then known as the Greater Anglia franchise, in February 2012. Initially  it traded under the same name until it rebranded as Abellio Greater Anglia in December 2013.

Ticket barriers were installed in 2011. The through platforms (platforms 1 and 2) were extended to accommodate 12-coach trains in December 2011, though initially no 12-coach trains were scheduled to call.

During the 2012 Summer Olympics, Cheshunt and Waltham Cross stations were the main access point for the Broxbourne whitewater canoe and kayak slalom.

An Oyster Card extension to Cheshunt was introduced in January 2013, with the station in Travelcard zone 8.

The Liverpool Street–Cheshunt via Seven Sisters service is run by London Overground, after a change from Abellio Greater Anglia in May 2015.

All other services remain under Abellio, which also retains responsibility for the station management.

Services
The typical off-peak service of trains per hour (tph) in September 2019  is as follows:

Trains operate in both directions.

Facilities
In 2019 the station consists of two 12 car platforms and one 8-car bay platform used by Southbury Loop services. The modern ticket building is located on the down side and a footbridge links the two through platforms. The station is staffed on all days of the week and a small coffee kiosk is located in the station building.

Bike racks and a 184 space car park are provided. Buses pick up from outside the station.

References

External links

Railway stations in Hertfordshire
DfT Category C2 stations
[Category:Former Great Eastern Railway stations]]
Railway stations in Great Britain opened in 1846
Railway stations in Great Britain closed in 1891
Railway stations in Great Britain opened in 1891
Greater Anglia franchise railway stations
1846 establishments in England
Cheshunt
Railway stations served by London Overground